Cooking for Pump-Kin: Special Menu is a compilation album by Euro House DJ/producer Benny Benassi released in 2007. This is the second release on  the Pump-Kin Music label.

This is the official compilation from Benny Benassi's 'Canadian Bus Tour'.

"I wanted to do this tour across Canada in a bus and not by a plane to get to know the country better. I've played my sets in various towns over the past few years and I've always wished to come back and explore. I also thought it would be a good idea to have a kind of souvenir of my Canadian journey to share with all the people who come out and party when I play. That's the reason behind this compilation. I really hope you have as much fun listening to it as I did mixing it. Thanks, Benny".

Track listing
Depeche Mode - "Everything Counts" (Oliver Huntemann & Stephen Bodzin Dub) – 6:35
D.I.M. - "Sisyphos" – 3:50
Ame - "Rej" (Pastaboys Club Mix) – 3:34
Bodyrox featuring Luciana - "Yeah, Yeah" (D. Ramirez Vocal Club Mix) – 3:33
Moby - "Go" (Trentemoller Remix) – 4:35
TV Rock featuring Seany B - "Flaunt It" (Dirty South Remix) – 4:16
Chris Lake featuring Laura V. - "Changes" (Dirty South Remix) – 4:24
Audiojack - "Robot" – 3:44
Fedde le Grand - "Put Your Hands Up For Detroit" – 3:59
Dave Spoon - "At Night" – 4:07
Benny Benassi - "Party All The Time  (Toscadisco Bombenalarm Mix)" - 4:26
John Acquaviva presents Sroen Weber - "First Stroke" – 4:14
Jerry Ropero - "The Storm" (Dubelektro Mix) – 4:36
Sono - "Keep Control" (Tocadisco Remix) – 4:10
Boosta - "Dance is Dead" (Tocadisco Remix) – 4:10
Benny Benassi presents The Biz - "Love Is Gonna Save Us" (2007 remix) – 4:07

External links
 

DJ mix albums
Benny Benassi albums
2007 compilation albums